John Hulme may refer to:

John Hulme (footballer) (1945–2008), English professional footballer
John Hulme (Derbyshire cricketer) (1862–1940),  English cricketer who played for Derbyshire 1887–1903
John Hulme (Shropshire cricketer) (born 1950), Welsh cricketer who played for Shropshire 
John Hulme (author) (born 1969), American children's writer and film director
John Walter Hulme (1805–1861), British Hong Kong lawyer and judge

See also
John Hume (disambiguation)